Festive Plateau is an ice-covered plateau over  high, about  long and  wide, just north of Mount Longhurst in the Churchill Mountains of Antarctica. It was named by two members of the Darwin Glacier Party of the Commonwealth Trans-Antarctic Expedition (1956–58) who spent Christmas Day 1957 on the plateau.

References 

Plateaus of Oates Land